Stingless bees, sometimes called stingless honey bees or simply meliponines, are a large group of bees (about 550 described species), comprising the tribe Meliponini (or subtribe Meliponina according to other authors). They belong in the family Apidae, and are closely related to common honey bees, carpenter bees, orchid bees, and bumblebees. Meliponines have stingers, but they are highly reduced and cannot be used for defense, though these bees exhibit other defensive behaviors and mechanisms. Meliponines are not the only type of bee incapable of stinging: all male bees and many female bees of several other families, such as Andrenidae, also cannot sting. Some stingless bees have powerful mandibles and can inflict painful bites.

Geographical distribution 

Stingless bees can be found in most tropical or subtropical regions of the world, such as Australia, Africa, Southeast Asia, and tropical America. The majority of native eusocial bees of Central and South America are stingless bees, although only a few of them produce honey on a scale such that they are farmed by humans. They are also quite diverse in Africa, including Madagascar, and are farmed there also; meliponine honey is prized as a medicine in many African communities, as well as in South America.

Behaviour 

Being tropical, stingless bees are active all year round, although they are less active in cooler weather, with some species presenting diapause. Unlike other eusocial bees, they do not sting, but will defend by biting if their nest is disturbed. In addition, a few (in the genus Oxytrigona) have mandibular secretions, including formic acid, that cause painful blisters.  Despite their lack of a sting, stingless bees, being eusocial, may have very large colonies made formidable by the number of defenders.

Hives 

Stingless bees usually nest in hollow trunks, tree branches, underground cavities, termite nests or rock crevices, but they have also been encountered in wall cavities, old rubbish bins, water meters, and storage drums. Many beekeepers keep the bees in their original log hive or transfer them to a wooden box, as this makes  controlling the hive easier. Some beekeepers put them in bamboos, flowerpots, coconut shells, and other recycling containers such as a water jug, a broken guitar, and other safe and closed containers.

The bees store pollen and honey in large, egg-shaped pots made of beeswax (typically) mixed with various types of plant resin; this combination is sometimes referred to as "cerumen" (which is, incidentally, the medical term for earwax). These pots are often arranged around a central set of horizontal brood combs, wherein the larvae are housed. When the young worker bees emerge from their cells, they tend to initially remain inside the hive, performing different jobs. As workers age, they become guards or foragers. Unlike the larvae of honey bees and many social wasps, meliponine larvae are not actively fed by adults (progressive provisioning). Pollen and nectar are placed in a cell, within which an egg is laid, and the cell is sealed until the adult bee emerges after pupation (mass provisioning). At any one time, hives can contain 300–80,000 workers, depending on species.

The remainder of the nest cavity, including the entrance tubes, is generally lined with of a mixture of secreted wax, plant resins ("propolis"), and other substances such as animal feces.

Role differentiation 

In a simplified sense, the sex of each bee depends on the number of chromosomes it receives. Female bees have two sets of chromosomes (diploid)—one set from the queen and another from one of the male bees or drones. Drones have only one set of chromosomes (haploid), and are the result of unfertilized eggs, though inbreeding can result in diploid drones.

Unlike true honey bees, whose female bees may become workers or queens strictly depending on what kind of food they receive as larvae (queens are fed royal jelly and workers are fed pollen), the caste system in meliponines is variable, and commonly based simply on the amount of pollen consumed; larger amounts of pollen yield queens in the genus Melipona. Also, a genetic component occurs, however, and as much as 25% (typically 5–14%) of the female brood may be queens. Queen cells in the former case can be distinguished from others by their larger size, as they are stocked with more pollen, but in the latter case, the cells are identical to worker cells, and scattered among the worker brood. When the new queens emerge, they typically leave to mate, and most die. New nests are not established by swarms, but by a procession of workers that gradually construct a new nest at a secondary location. The nest is then joined by a newly mated queen, at which point many workers take up permanent residence and help the new queen raise her own workers. If a ruling queen is herself weak or dying, then a new queen can replace her. For Plebeia quadripunctata, although fewer than 1% of female worker cells produce dwarf queens, they comprise six of seven queen bees, and one of five proceed to head colonies of their own. They are reproductively active, but less fecund than large queens.

Soldier caste 
While the existence of a soldier caste is well known in ants and termites, the phenomenon was unknown among bees until 2012, when  some stingless bees were found to have a similar caste of defensive specialists that help guard the nest entrance against intruders; to date, at least 10 species have been documented to possess such "soldiers", including Tetragonisca angustula, T. fiebrigi, and Frieseomelitta longipes, with the guards not only larger, but also sometimes a different color from ordinary workers.

Stingless bees of Australia 
Of the 1,600 species of wild bees native to Australia, about 14 are stingless. These species bear a variety of names, including Australian native honey bees, native bees, sugar-bag bees, and sweat bees (because they will land on a sweaty person to drink in dry times or areas). All are small and black in colour, with hairy extended hind legs for carrying nectar and pollen; because of the latter, they are sometimes mistaken for bumblebees. The various stingless species look quite similar, with the two most common species, Tetragonula carbonaria and Austroplebeia australis, displaying the greatest variation, as the latter is smaller and less active. Both of these inhabit the area around Brisbane.

As stingless bees are harmless to humans, they have become an increasingly attractive addition to the suburban backyard. Most meliponine beekeepers do not keep the bees for honey, but rather for the pleasure of conserving a native species whose original habitat is declining due to human development. In return, the bees pollinate crops, garden flowers, and bushland during their search for nectar and pollen. While a number of beekeepers fill a small niche market for bush honey, native meliponines only produce small amounts and the structure of their hives makes the honey difficult to extract. Only in warm areas of Australia such as Queensland and northern New South Wales can the bees produce more honey than they need for their own survival. The bees only come out of the hive when it is above about 18 degrees Celsius (64 degrees Fahrenheit). Harvesting honey from a nest in a cooler area could weaken or even kill the nest.

Honey production 
In warm areas of Australia, these bees can be used for minor honey production. They may also be kept successfully in boxes in these areas. Special methods are being developed to harvest moderate amounts of honey from stingless bees in these areas without causing harm.

Like the European honey bee (Apis mellifera), which provides most of Australia's commercially produced honey, stingless bees have enlarged areas on their back legs for carrying pollen back to the hive. After a foraging expedition, these pollen baskets or corbiculae can be seen stuffed full of bright orange or yellow pollen. Stingless bees also collect nectar, which they store in an extension of their gut called a crop. Back at the hive, the bees ripen or dehydrate the nectar droplets by spinning them inside their mouthparts until honey is formed. Ripening concentrates the nectar and increases the sugar content, though it is not nearly as concentrated as the honey from true honey bees. Nectar is generally 70%-80% water and stingless bees remove far less of this water from their honey than European honey bees, who take their honey's water content down to around 18%. Stingless bee honey is consequently much runnier than commercial honey and more prone to spoiling by microorganisms, such as yeasts.

Stingless bees store their aromatic honey in clusters of small resin pots near the extremities of the nest. For honey production, the bees need to be kept in a box specially designed to make the honey stores accessible without damaging the rest of the nest structure. Some recent box designs for honey production provide a separate compartment for the honey stores so the honey pots can be removed without spilling honey into other areas of the nest. Unlike a hive of commercial honeybees, which can produce 75 kg (165 lbs) of honey a year, a hive of Australian stingless bees produces less than 1 kg (2 lbs). Stingless bee honey has a distinctive "bush" taste—a mix of sweet and sour with a hint of fruit. The taste comes from plant resins—which the bees use to build their hives and honey pots—and varies at different times of year depending on the flowers and trees visited.

In 2020 researchers at the University of Queensland found that some species of stingless bee in Australia, Malaysia, and Brazil produce honey that has trehalulose—a sugar with an unusually low glycaemic index (GI) compared to that of glucose and fructose, the main sugars composing conventional honey. Such low glycaemic index honey is beneficial for humans because its consumption does not cause blood sugar to spike, forcing the body to make more insulin in response. Honey with trehalulose is also beneficial as it this sugar cannot nourish the lactic acid-producing bacteria that cause tooth decay. The university's findings supported the long-standing claims of Indigenous Australian people that native honey is beneficial to human health.

Pollination 

Australian farmers rely almost exclusively on the introduced western honey bee to pollinate their crops. However, native bees may be better pollinators for certain agricultural crops. Stingless bees have been shown to be valuable pollinators of tropical plants such as macadamias and mangos. Their foraging may also benefit strawberries, watermelons, citrus, avocados, lychees, and many others. Research into the use of stingless bees for crop pollination in Australia is still in its very early stages, but these bees show great potential. Studies at the University of Western Sydney have shown these bees are effective pollinators even in confined areas, such as glasshouses.

Stingless bees of Brazil 

Brazil is home to several species of stingless bees belonging to Meliponini, with more than 300 species already identified and probably more yet to be discovered. They vary greatly in shape, size, and habits, and 20 to 30 of these species have good potential as honey producers. Although they are still quite unknown by most people, an increasing number of beekeepers have been dedicated to these bees throughout the country. This activity has experienced significant growth since August 2004, when national laws were changed to allow native bee colonies to be freely marketed, which was previously forbidden in an unsuccessful attempt to protect these species. Nowadays the capture or destruction of existing colonies in nature is still forbidden, and only new colonies formed by the bees themselves in artificial traps can be collected from the wild. Most colonies marketed are artificially produced by authorized beekeepers, through division of already existing captive colonies. Besides honey production, Brazilian stingless bees such as the irapuá (Trigona spinipes) serve as major pollinators of tropical plants and are considered the ecological equivalent of the honey bee.

Also, much practical and academic work is being done about the best ways of keeping such bees, multiplying their colonies, and exploring the honey they produce. Among many others, species such as jandaíra (Melipona subnitida) and true uruçu (Melipona scutellaris) in the northeast of the country, mandaçaia (Melipona quadrifasciata) and yellow uruçu (Melipona rufiventris) in the south-southeast, tiúba or jupará (Melipona interrupta) and straw-bee (Scaptotrigona polysticta) in the north and jataí (Tetragonisca angustula) throughout the country are increasingly kept by small, medium, and large producers. Many other species as the Mandaguari (Scaptotrigona postica), the Guaraipo (Melipona bicolor) and the Iraí (Nannotrigona testaceicornis), to mention a few, are also reared in smaller scale. Through the cultivation of honey or selling of colonies, keeping stingless bees is an increasingly profitable activity. A single colony of species like mandaçaia and true "uruçu" can be divided up to four times a year, and each of the new colonies obtained this way can be sold for about US$100.

According to the Ministry of the Environment there are presently four species of Meliponini listed in the National Red List of Threatened Species in Brazil. Melipona capixaba, Melipona rufiventris, Melipona scutellaris, and Partamona littoralis all listed as Endangered (EN).

Honey production 
Although the colony sizes of most of these bees are much smaller than those of the European honey bee, the per-bee productivity can be quite high, with colonies containing fewer than a thousand bees being able to produce up to 4 liters (one US gallon) of honey every year. Probably the world champion in honey productivity, the manduri (Melipona marginata), lives in swarms with only about 300 individuals, but even so, it can produce up to 3 liters (.79 US gallon) of honey a year in the right conditions. One of the smallest among all bees in the genus Melipona, with lengths ranging from 6 to 7 mm (15/64" to 9/32"), Is being used in some countries such as Japan and Germany as a pollinator for greenhouses. Although they do not tend to attack if not molested, when they feel the nest is under menace, these tiny bees' reaction is violent, and their strong jaws can penetrate human skin.

Species of the genus Scaptotrigona have very large colonies, with up to 20,000 individuals, and can produce from 8 to 12 liters (2-3 US gallons) of honey a year, but they are somewhat aggressive and thus not popular among Brazilian meliponine beekeepers. Some large breeders have more than 3,000 hives of the tamer but still highly productive species in the genus Melipona, such as the tiúba, the true uruçu, and the jandaíra, each with 3,000 or more bees per colony. They can produce over 1.5 tons (3,000 lbs) of honey every year. In large bee farms, only the availability of flowers limits the honey production per colony. Their honey is considered more palatable because not overly sweet, and it also is thought to have medicinal properties more pronounced than honey from bees of the genus Apis due to the higher level of antimicrobial substances. As a result, the honey from stingless bees returns very high profits, with prices as much as 5-10 times greater than those for the more common honey produced by European or Africanized bees. However, much larger numbers of beehives are required to produce amounts of honey comparable to that of European or Africanized bees. Also, due to the fact of those bees storing honey in cerumen pots instead of standardized honeycombs as in the honeybee rearing makes extraction a lot more difficult and laborious.

The honey from stingless bees has a lighter color and a higher water content, from 25% to 35%, compared to the honey from the genus Apis. This contributes to its less cloying taste but also causes it to spoil more easily. Thus, for marketing, this honey needs to be processed through desiccation or pasteurization. In its natural state, it should be kept under refrigeration.

Bees as pets 

Due to the lack of a functional stinger and characteristic nonaggressive behavior of many Brazilian species of stingless bees, they can be reared without problems in densely populated environments such as cities, provided enough flowers are at their disposal nearby. Some breeders (meliponicultors) can produce honey even in apartments up to the 12th floor.

Despite being in general fairly peaceful, with exception of a few species such as the tubuna (Scaptotrigona bipunctata), most Brazilian meliponines will react if their hives are molested, nipping with their jaws, entangling themselves in the hair, trying to enter in the ears or the nose, and releasing propolis or even acid over their aggressors.

Some species, nevertheless, are more suitable for rearing at home as pets. The mandaçaia are extremely tame, not attacking humans even when their hives are opened for honey extraction or colony division. They form small, manageable colonies of only 400–600 individuals. At the same time, a single rational beehive of mandaçaia can produce up to 4 liters (1 US gallon) of honey a year, making the species very attractive for home keepers. They are fairly large bees, up to 11 mm (7/16") in length, and as a result have better body heat control, allowing them to live in regions where temperatures can drop a little lower than 0 °C (32 °F). However, they are somewhat selective about which flowers they will visit, preferring the flora that occurs in their natural environment. They are thus difficult to keep outside their region of origin, along the east coast of Brazil from the state of Bahia south.

Other species, like the tiúba and the true uruçu, are also very tame and highly productive. Their colonies have from 3000–5000 individuals (for comparison, the population of honeybee swarms can peak at 80000 individuals) and can produce up to 10 liters (2.6 US gallons) of honey a year. They can be easily kept at home but will survive only in regions with a warm climate, their larvae dying at temperatures lower than 12 °C (54 °F). The yellow uruçu, however, can survive at temperatures lower than 0 °C (32 °F), and their colonies, bearing about 3500 individuals, can produce up to 6 liters (1.5 US gallons) of honey a year. But this species will react with powerful nipping if its nests are molested, and usually they are only kept by professional meliponicultors.

Another suitable species for keeping at home is the guaraipo (Melipona bicolor). It is also quite tame, never attacking the beekeeper, and their colonies have fewer than 600 individuals. They can withstand temperatures as low as −10 °C (14 °F), and each colony can produce over 3 liters ( US gallons) of honey a year. Their colonies usually have more than one single queen at a time (usually two or three, but sometimes up to five), a phenomenon called polygyne, and thus are less sensitive to the death of one queen, which can cause the loss of a whole colony in other species. But the guaraipo is very sensitive to low levels of humidity, and their hives must be equipped with means to keep a high moisture content. Once very common, the guaraipo is now rather rare in nature, mainly due to the destruction of their native forests in the south-southeast of Brazil.

Other groups of Brazilian stingless bees, genera Plebeia and Leurotrigona, are also very tame and much smaller, with one of them (Plebeia minima) reaching no more than 2.5 mm (3/32") in length, and the lambe-olhos ("lick-eyes" bee, Leurotrigona muelleri) being even smaller, at no more than 1.5 mm (3/32"). Many of these species are known as mirim (meaning 'small' in the Tupi-Guarani languages). As a result, they can be kept in very small artificial hives, thus being of interest for keepers who want them as pollinators in small glasshouses or just for the pleasure of having a ‘toy’ bee colony at home. Being so tiny, these species produce only a very small amount of honey, typically less than 500 ml (1/2 US pint) a year, so are not interesting for commercial honey production.

Belonging to the same group, the jatai (Tetragonisca angustula), the marmelada (Frieseomelitta varia), and the moça-branca (Frieseomelitta doederleini) are intermediate in size between those very small species and the European bee. They are very adaptable species; the jataí, and can be reared in many different regions and environments, being quite common in most Brazilian cities. The jataí can bite when molested, but its jaws are weak, and in practice they are harmless, while the marmelada and moça-branca usually deposit propolis on their aggressors. Producing up to 1.5 liters (0.4 US gallons) of honey a year, their honey is considered among the best from stingless bees. In fact, the jataí was one of the first species to be kept by home beekeepers. Their nests can be easily identified in trees or wall cavities by the wax pipe they build at the entrance, usually guarded by some soldier bees, which are stronger than regular worker bees. The marmelada and moça-branca make a little less honey, but it is denser and sweeter than most from other stingless bees and is considered very tasty.

Maya stingless bees of Central America 

The stingless bees Melipona beecheii and M. yucatanica are the primary native bees cultured in Central America, though a few other species are reported as being occasionally managed (e.g., Trigona fulviventris and Scaptotrigona mexicana). They were extensively cultured by the Maya civilization for honey, and regarded as sacred. They continue to be cultivated by the modern Maya peoples, although these bees are endangered due to massive deforestation, altered agricultural practices (especially overuse of insecticides), and changing beekeeping practices with the arrival of the Africanized honey bee, which produces much greater honey crops.

History 
Native meliponines (M. beecheii being the favorite) have been kept by the lowland Maya for thousands of years. The Yucatec Maya language name for this bee is xunan kab, meaning "(royal, noble) lady bee".  The bees were once the subject of religious ceremonies and were a symbol of the bee-god Ah-Muzen-Cab, known from the Madrid Codex.

The bees were, and still are, treated as pets. Families would have one or many log-hives hanging in and around their houses. Although they are stingless, the bees do bite and can leave welts similar to a mosquito bite. The traditional way to gather bees, still favored among the locals, is find a wild hive, then the branch is cut around the hive to create a portable log, enclosing the colony. This log is then capped on both ends with another piece of wood or pottery and sealed with mud. This clever method keeps the melipine bees from mixing their brood, pollen, and honey in the same comb as do the European bees. The brood is kept in the middle of the hive, and the honey is stored in vertical "pots" on the outer edges of the hive. A temporary, replaceable cap at the end of the log allows for easy access to the honey while doing minimal damage to the hive. However, inexperienced handlers can still do irreversible damage to a hive, causing the hive to swarm and abscond from the log. With proper maintenance, though, hives have been recorded as lasting over 80 years, being passed down through generations. In the archaeological record of Mesoamerica, stone discs have been found that are generally considered to be the caps of long-disintegrated logs that once housed the beehives.

Tulum 

Tulum, the site of a pre-Columbian Maya city on the Caribbean coast 130 km (81 mi) south of Cancun, has a god depicted repeatedly all over the site. Upside down, he appears as a small figure over many doorways and entrances. One of the temples, the "Templo del Dios Descendente" or the Temple of the Descending God, stands just left of the central plaza. Speculation is that he may be the "Bee God", Ah Muzen Cab, as seen in the Madrid Codex. It is possible that this was a religious/trade center with emphasis on xunan kab, the "royal lady".

Economic uses 

Balché, a traditional Mesoamerican alcoholic beverage similar to mead, was made from fermented honey and the bark of the leguminous balché tree (Lonchocarpus violaceus), hence its name. It was traditionally brewed in a canoe. The drink was known to have entheogenic properties, that is, to produce mystical experiences, and was consumed in medicinal and ritual practices. Beekeepers would place the nests near the psychoactive plant Turbina corymbosa and possibly near balché trees, forcing the bees to use nectar from these plants to make their honey. Additionally, brewers would add extracts of the bark of the balché tree to the honey mixture before fermentation. The resulting beverage is responsible for psychotropic effects when consumed, due to the ergoline compounds in the pollen of the T. corymbosa, the Melipona nectar gathered from the balché flowers, or the hallucinogenic compounds of the balché tree bark.

Lost-wax casting, a common metalworking method typically found where the inhabitants keep bees, was also used by the Maya. The wax from Melipona is soft and easy to work, especially in the humid Maya lowland. This allowed the Maya to create smaller works of art, jewelry, and other metalsmithing that would be difficult to forge. It also makes use of the leftovers from honey extraction. If the hive was damaged beyond repair, the whole of the comb could be used, thus using all of the hive. With experienced keepers, though, only the honey pot could be removed, the honey extracted, and the wax used for casting or other purposes.

Future 
The outlook for meliponines in Mesoamerica is uncertain. The number of active Melipona beekeepers is rapidly declining in favor of the more economical, nonindigenous Africanized Apis mellifera. The high honey yield, 100 kg (220 lbs) or more annually, along with the ease of hive care and ability to create new hives from existing stock, commonly outweighs the negative consequences of "killer bee" hive maintenance.

Further complicating the issue, Africanized honey bees do not visit some flora, such as those in the tomato family, and several forest trees and shrubs, which rely on the native stingless bees for pollination. A decline in populations of native flora has already occurred in areas where stingless bees have been displaced by Africanized honey bees.

An additional blow to the art of meliponine beekeeping is that many of the meliponine beekeepers are now elderly, and their hives may not be cared for once they die. The hives are considered similar to an old family collection, to be parted out once the collector dies or to be buried in whole or part along with the beekeeper upon death. In fact, a survey of a once-popular area of the Maya lowlands shows the rapid decline of beekeepers, down to around 70 in 2004 from thousands in the late 1980s. It is traditional in the Maya lowlands that the hive itself or parts of the hive be buried along with the beekeeper to volar al cielo, "to fly to heaven". Conservation efforts are underway in several parts of Mesoamerica.

Stingless bee species that produce honey 
Austroplebeia spp.
A. australis
A. cassiae
A. cincta
A. essingtoni
A. magna
Cephalotrigona
C. capitata
Frieseomelitta
F. doederleini
F. varia
Heterotrigona
H. itama
 Melipona
M. asilvai
M. beecheii
M. bicolor
M. capixaba
M. compressipes
M. costaricensis
M. crinita
M. eburnea
M. fasciata
M. fasciculata
M. favosa
M. flavolineata
M. fuliginosa
M. marginata
M. panamica
M. quadrifasciata
M. rufiventris
M. scutellaris
M. seminigra
M. subnitida
M. yucatanica
 Meliponula spp.
M. bocandei
Paratrigona
P. subnuda
Partamona
P. seridoensis
P. helleri
Scaptotrigona
S. bipunctata
S. polysticta
S. postica
S. tubiba
S. mexicana
Schwarziana
S. quadripunctata
Tetragona
T. clavipes
T. quadrangula
Tetragonisca
T. angustula
Tetragonula
T. carbonaria
T. hockingsi
Trigona (genus)
T. iridipennis (Tetragonula iridipennis)

References

External links

International Bee Research Association
Stingless honey bees of Brazil
Mayan Stingless Bee Keeping: Going, Going, Gone?
A Different Kind of Beekeeping Takes Flight